The 1927 Greyhound Derby took place during October 1927 with the final being held on 15 October 1927 at White City Stadium. The competition was inaugurated by the Greyhound Racing Association and the prize money was substantial with £1,000 and a gold cup given to the winner, £300 to the runner-up and £100 to third place. This greyhound racing event began with heats at regional level, with winners progressing to a Northern final and Southern final prior to a national final at White City. The Derby would soon be established as the most significant race in UK greyhound racing.

Race 
The qualifiers from the Northern final were Great Chum, Elder Brother and Banderloo but Great Chum was replaced by Derham Boy for the final because of illness. The Southern final was won by Entry Badge by four lengths in a time of 29.20 seconds.

This was the first ever Derby final and was held on 15 October 1927. It was won in a time of 29.01 seconds by Entry Badge, a brindled dog weighing , trained by Joe Harmon and owned by Edwin Baxter. Ever Bright came second, six lengths behind. Baxter owned the first three home.

Entry Badge, who had cost Baxter 40 guineas, was a granddaughter of a great coursing dog called Hopsack.

Final result 
At White City (over 500 yards):

Distances 
6, ½, head, 3, 1 (lengths)
The distances between the greyhounds are in finishing order and shown in lengths. From 1927-1950 one length was equal to 0.06 of one second but race times are shown as 0.08 as per modern day calculations.

Semi finals

+ Called in as reserve for the final u=unplaced

See also
 1927 UK & Ireland Greyhound Racing Year

References 

Greyhound Derby
English Greyhound Derby
Greyhound racing in London
English Greyhound Derby
English Greyhound Derby